VOC, VoC or voc may refer to:

Science and technology
 Open-circuit voltage (VOC), the voltage between two terminals when there is no external load connected
 Variant of concern, a category used during the assessment of a new variant of a virus
 Volatile organic compound, a category of vaporous chemical

Organisations
 Dutch East India Company (Vereenigde Oost-Indische Compagnie in Dutch) (1602–1800), a Dutch chartered company
 Vancouver Organizing Committee for the 2010 Olympic and Paralympic Winter Games, the organizer of the 2010 Vancouver Olympics
 Vannes Olympique Club, a French association football club
 Victims of Communism Memorial Foundation, an anti-communist organization in the United States
 VOC Amsterdam, a women's handball club in the Netherlands

Other uses
 V. O. C. Nagar railway station, Chennai, Tamil Nadu, India (Indian Railways station code)
 V. O. Chidambaram Pillai (1872–1936), Indian lawyer, trade union leader, shipping magnate and freedom fighter
 Voice of the customer, a term to describe the process of capturing a customer's requirements